Clube Desportivo de Beja is a Portuguese football club based in Beja, Alentejo. It was founded in 1947. The club's current home stadium is Complexo Desportivo Fernando Mamede which has a capacity of 3,500. The club finished eleventh in the 2011–12 AF Beja First Division.

Appearances
Tier 2: 1
Tier 3: 23
Tier 4: 32

League and cup history

Current squad

Notes

External links
Official site
Zerozero team profile
ForaDeJogo.net profile

Football clubs in Portugal
Association football clubs established in 1947
1947 establishments in Portugal
Beja, Portugal
Liga Portugal 2 clubs